The Robe is the third studio album released by the hard rock band Ten. It was the third and last album produced by Mike Stone.

The Robe / Bonus Collection containing 2 discs and 23 songs was released in 1999.

Track listing
All songs written by Gary Hughes except where noted.

 "The Robe" – 9:04
 "Bright On the Blade" – 4:51
 "Standing On the Edge of Time" – 5:03 (Gary Hughes, Vinny Burns)
 "Virtual Reality" – 5:49 
 "Arcadia" – 7:34
 "Battlelines" – 4:18
 "You're In My Heart" – 6:38
 "Fly Like an Eagle" – 7:13
 "Ten Fathoms Deep" – 7:10
 "Someday" – 7:58 (Gary Hughes, Vinny Burns)

2016 japanese SHM-CD remaster (AVALON MICP-11296) bonus track:
"If Only For A Day" - 8:12

Personnel
Gary Hughes – vocals and programming
Vinny Burns – Lead guitars and programming
John Halliwell – Rhythm guitars
Ged Rylands – keyboards
Greg Morgan – drums and percussion
Andrew Webb – bass guitar
Jason Thanos – backing vocals
Ray Brophy – backing vocals and programming
Ed Collins – trumpet and flugelhorn
Dru Baker – tenor and alto saxophone
Dave Chadwick – Voiceovers

Production
Mixing – Mike Stone
Engineer – Ray Brophy
Additional Engineering – Audu Obaje, Tim Baxter and Royston Hollyer

Concepts
The song "The Robe" depicts the quest of the escaping Christian Knights after the siege of Jerusalem, who were trying to find a safe hiding place for the robe used to wrap Christ's body following the Crucifixion. The Robe is also a novel about the Crucifixion written by Lloyd C. Douglas, from which several concepts and ideas were used.

References

External links
Heavy Harmonies page

Ten (band) albums
1997 albums